Heolddu Comprehensive School is a school located in the town of Bargoed, South Wales, and serves the town of Bargoed as well as the villages of Deri, Aberbargoed, Tir-Phil, Cascade, Gilfach, Tredegar and Brithdir in the Caerphilly LEA. The school has 700 pupils and 40 teaching staff.

History
The building itself was constructed in 1974. Until 2017 the school's motto had been "opportunity for all", it was then changed to “Achieving Excellence Together”.

Alumni

Hefin David – Member of the Senedd
James Fox – Represented the UK in the 2004 Eurovision Song Contest.
Lauren Price – Ex-footballer and professional kickboxer, competing at the 2014 and 2018 Commonwealth Games, Olympic Gold Champion.
Tegan Nox – Professional wrestler formerly signed to WWE.
David Price – Professional Golfer. Welsh Amateur Champion, Portuguese Amateur Champion and Welsh International, played on the European Tour . Studied at Heolddu and plays at Bargoed Golf Club
Nathan Cleverly – European and World champion boxer
Kieron Evans – Professional footballer

References

External links
Heolddu Comprehensive School

Secondary schools in Caerphilly County Borough